Battista Serioli (26 November 1900 – 21 December 2007) was one of the last four Italian veterans of the First World War, although excluded from Italian government lists as it only counts those with more than six months of service. Born in Brescia, Serioli signed up in May 1918. He did his training in Verona and Padova, and fought in the Battle of Vittorio Veneto. He also later worked as an administrator, staying in the Italian Army until 1921. He died in Sale Marasino aged 107.

References

1900 births
2007 deaths
Italian centenarians
Men centenarians
Italian military personnel of World War I
People from Brescia